Penrith is an electoral district of the Legislative Assembly in the Australian state of New South Wales since 1973. It has been represented by Stuart Ayres of the Liberal Party since the 2010 by-election. It was a safe  seat for most of its history before 2010, but Ayres won the 2010 by-election with a swing of 25.7 percent—at the time, the biggest swing against a sitting government in New South Wales history.

Penrith includes the suburbs of Penrith, Emu Heights, Emu Plains, Glenbrook, Jamisontown, Lapstone, Lemongrove, Leonay, South Penrith and parts of Blaxland, Caddens, Cambridge Park, Castlereagh, Cambridge Gardens, Cranebrook, Kingswood and Werrington.

Members for Penrith

Election results

References

Penrith
1973 establishments in Australia
Constituencies established in 1973